Ginegar, is a kibbutz in northern Israel not far from Nazareth. Located near Migdal HaEmek, it falls under the jurisdiction of Jezreel Valley Regional Council.

History

Ottoman era
In the Ottoman era, there was an Arab village here called Junjar, probably preserving the name of the ancient Jewish village "Nigenar" or "Neginegar" traditionally considered the seat of rabbi Johanan ben Nuri. 
The village was  designated as Timar land.

In 1882, the PEF's Survey of Western Palestine (SWP) described Junjar as a small adobe village, at the foot of the hills, supplied by a well. A population list from about 1887 showed that  Junjar had about  125 inhabitants; all Muslims.

Gottlieb Schumacher, as part of surveying for the construction of the Jezreel Valley railway, noted in 1900 that Junjar had increased slightly (compared with the SWP-findings), and it then numbered 16 huts and had about 70 inhabitants.

British Mandate era

Jinjar (Arab village)

The area was acquired by the Jewish community as part of the Sursock Purchase. In 1921, 4,000 dunums of land  in Jinjar was  sold to Zionist groups  by the Sursock family, its absentee landlords  in Lebanon. At the time, there were 25 families living there.

At the time of the 1922 census of Palestine Jenjar  had a population of 175; 13 Jews,  118   Muslims and 44 Christian, where the  Christians  were 31 Orthodox and 13 Roman Catholics.

Kibbutz Ginegar

The kibbutz was established in 1922 in the Lower Galilee on the eve of Rosh Hashanah. The Kibbutz was named after the ancient well of Gingar, which can today still be found under the laundry. The kibbutz founders, working at moshavim in the area at the time, came in the second and third Aliyahs. They united in 1920 to establish Degania Gimel south of Degania Bet, at a site later used by kibbutz Beit Zera. From here they needed to move due to a lack of land, and so they arrived at Ginegar, which is believed to be a distortion of Nagnager, a village in the Galilee cited in the Talmud.

In 1928, the Jewish National Fund recruited members of Ginegar to plant Balfour Forest, its first forestation project.

In the 1931 census it had a population of 109, all Jews, in a total of 17 houses.

Economy
On the kibbutz is a large plastics factory, also named Ginegar. The factory produces mainly plastic products for agriculture. Ginegar accepted volunteers who lived and worked on the kibbutz for many years, but the volunteer program was eventually phased out.

References

Bibliography

 
 

 "beetles"; a ruined tower  p. 146)

External links
Official website 
Pictures: the first years of the kibbutz, landscape
Pictures: the first years of the kibbutz, daily life
Survey of Western Palestine, Map 8: IAA, Wikimedia commons  

Kibbutzim
Kibbutz Movement
Jezreel Valley Regional Council
Populated places established in 1922
Populated places in Northern District (Israel)
Polish-Jewish culture in Israel
Russian-Jewish culture in Israel
1922 establishments in Mandatory Palestine